Roberto Soto (born September 12, 1948) is a Puerto Rican professional wrestler, better known by his ring name, Invader II. Soto was one-half of the tag team "The Invaders" with Invader I.

Professional wrestling career
Although competing primarily in the Puerto Rican-based World Wrestling Council with González, Soto would also wrestle in International World Class Championship Wrestling and Continental Championship Wrestling during the 1980s.

In 1988, he was among those present when wrestler Bruiser Brody was stabbed to death by Soto's tag team partner José González while at a WWC event in San Juan, Puerto Rico and interpreted for American wrestlers after police officers arrived on the scene.

Competing in Japan during the 1990s, he would later return to the WWC teaming with Invader III in a feud against González . However, their alliance was short-lived, with Soto eventually defeating Invader III in a mask vs. mask match at WWC Anniversary on August 1, 1998.

Championships and accomplishments
Americas Wrestling Federation
AWF World Tag Team Championship (1 time) - with Invader IV
Continental Championship Wrestling
NWA Alabama Heavyweight Championship (1 time)
NWA Continental Heavyweight Championship (1 time)
NWA Gulf Coast Tag Team Championship (1 time) - with Ramón Pérez
NWA Wrestle Birmingham Heavyweight Championship (1 time)

Central States Wrestling
NWA Central States Heavyweight Championship (1 time)

Georgia Championship Wrestling
NWA Southeastern Tag Team Championship (Georgia version) (4 times) - with Argentina Apollo (1), Bob Armstrong (2) and Tim Woods (1)
NWA Southeastern Heavyweight Championship (1 time)
NWA Macon Tag Team Championship (2 times) - with Cyclone (1) and Tom Jones (1) 

NWA Gulf Coast
NWA Gulf Coast Louisiana Championship (1 time)

NWA San Francisco
NWA World Tag Team Championship (San Francisco version) (2 times) - with Invader I (2) 

NWA Wildside
NWA Wildside Heavyweight Championship (1 time)

World Wrestling Council
WWC North American Tag Team Championship (1 time) - with Invader I
WWC World Tag Team Championship (2 times) - with Invader I
WWC Junior Heavyweight Championship (1 time)
WWC Caribbean Tag Team Championship (1 time) - Invader IV (1)

Universal Wrestling Promotions
UWP Caribbean Tag Team Championship (1 time) - Invader I (1)

L&G Promotions
L&G Caribbean Heavyweight Championship (2 times) 

Pro Wrestling Illustrated
PWI ranked him # 257 of the 500 best singles wrestlers of the PWI 500 in 1998

See also
Professional wrestling in Puerto Rico

References

External links
 

1948 births
Living people
Masked wrestlers
Sportspeople from San Juan, Puerto Rico
Puerto Rican male professional wrestlers
NWA Macon Tag Team Champions
NWA Georgia Heavyweight Champions